Baron Peter von Uslar (Pjotr Karlovič Uslar) ( — was a Russian general, engineer and linguist of German descent, known for his research of languages and ethnography of peoples of Caucasus.

Biography 
Peter von Uslar was born in Kurovo manor in Vyshnevolotsky District, Tver Governorate, Russian Empire. After graduating from the Chief Engineering School, he graduated from the General Staff Academy and did not have formal education in linguistics.

In 1850 he was appointed member of the Caucasus  Department of the Russian Geographical Society and   ordered to compile the history of Caucasus. This appointment had eventually led to his interest in researching of Caucasian languages and to his tremendous contribution into the recording of numerous Caucasian languages from various linguistic groups, such as Abkhaz, Ubykh, Svan, Chechen, Avar, Lak, Tabasaran, Lezgian, Dargin, etc.

1816 births
1875 deaths
People from Tver Oblast
Russian people of German descent
Military Engineering-Technical University alumni
Military personnel of the Russian Empire
Russian engineers
Linguists from Russia
Caucasologists
Corresponding members of the Saint Petersburg Academy of Sciences